Ozu Abam is a town in Arochukwu local government area,  Abia State, Nigeria, populated by people from the Abam clan.

References

Populated places in Abia State